The White Horse Tavern was constructed before 1673 and is believed to be the oldest tavern building in the United States. It is located on the corner of Farewell and Marlborough streets in Newport, Rhode Island.

History

Francis Brinley, an English immigrant, constructed the original building on the site in 1652 on land obtained from his brother in law, William Coddington. In 1673, he sold the lot to William Mayes who enlarged the building to become a tavern. The building was also used for large meetings, including use as a Rhode Island General Assembly meeting place, a court house, and a city hall. William Mayes obtained a tavern license in 1687, and his son William Mayes, Jr. operated it through the early eighteenth century. The operation was named "The White Horse Tavern" in 1730 by owner Jonathan Nichols. 

Tories and British troops were quartered there during the British occupation of Newport in the American Revolution, around the time of the Battle of Rhode Island. Newport's Van Bueren family donated money to the private Preservation Society of Newport to restore the building in 1952, after years of neglect as a boarding house. After the restoration, the building was sold and once again operated as a private tavern and restaurant, and it remains a popular drinking and dining location today.

See also

 List of the oldest restaurants in the United States
 Oldest buildings in America
 National Register of Historic Places listings in Newport County, Rhode Island
 List of the oldest buildings in Rhode Island
 List of oldest companies
 List of oldest companies in the United States

References

Government of Rhode Island
Rhode Island
Landmarks in Rhode Island
Buildings and structures in Newport, Rhode Island
Taverns in Rhode Island
Taverns in the American Revolution
Residential buildings in Rhode Island
Restaurants in Rhode Island
Government buildings in Rhode Island
Drinking establishments on the National Register of Historic Places in Rhode Island
National Register of Historic Places in Newport, Rhode Island
Historic district contributing properties in Rhode Island